Stefan Hjalmar Tärnhuvud (born 16 January 1985) is a Swedish sprinter. He represented his country at three outdoor and two indoor European Championships.

International competitions

Personal bests

Outdoor
100 metres – 10.35 (+1.7 m/s, Helsinki 2012)
200 metres – 21.30 (+0.4 m/s, Helsinki 2008)
Indoor
60 metres – 6.67 (Gotheburg 2013)
200 metres – 22.13 (Malmö 2008)

References

Official site

1985 births
Living people
Swedish male sprinters
People from Uppsala Municipality
Sportspeople from Uppsala County
21st-century Swedish people